Pure Imagination is a 1992 album by American vocalist Michael Feinstein of songs for children.

Personnel
Michael Feinstein - vocals, piano

References

Elektra Records albums
Michael Feinstein albums
1992 albums